Judith of Rennes (982–1017), was Duchess of Normandy from  until her death.

Life
Judith, born in 982, was the daughter of Conan I, Duke of Brittany and Ermengarde-Gerberga of Anjou.  She was a part of an important double marriage alliance between Normandy and Brittany first recorded by William of Jumièges. 

In 996, her brother Geoffrey I, Duke of Brittany married Hawise of Normandy, daughter of Richard I, Duke of Normandy while in c. 1000 Judith married Richard II, Duke of Normandy, Hawise's brother. The duchess Judith died on 28 August 1017 and was buried in the abbey of Bernay, which she had founded in 1013.

Family
Judith married Richard II, Duke of Normandy  They had:
Richard (c. 997/1001), Duke of Normandy.
Alice of Normandy (c. 1002), married Renaud I, Count of Burgundy.
Robert (b. 22 Jun 1000), Duke of Normandy.
William (c. 1007/9), monk at Fécamp, d. 1025.
Eleanor (c. 1011/3), married to Baldwin IV, Count of Flanders.
 Matilda (c. 1013/5), nun at Fecamp, d. 1033. She died young and unmarried.

Notes

References

Sources

982 births
1017 deaths
People from Rennes
Duchesses of Normandy
10th-century Breton people
11th-century Breton people
10th-century Breton women
11th-century Breton women
House of Normandy
10th-century Norman women
11th-century Norman women